Naomi Peak, or Mount Naomi, is the highest peak in the Bear River Range in northern Utah and southern Idaho, United States.

Description
The summit is located northeast of Logan, in the Mount Naomi Wilderness of the Wasatch-Cache National Forest.  Several trails from the north, east, and south converge at Mount Naomi.  The most traveled trail (approximately  one way) is likely the one that starts at the Tony Grove Lake parking area just east of Naomi Peak.  The road leading in to Tony Grove from U.S. Route 89 is entirely paved and easily accessible in the summer months.

See also

 List of mountains in Utah

References

External links

 Naomi Peak. SummitPost.

Mountains of Utah
Mountains of Cache County, Utah
Tourist attractions in Cache County, Utah